Danildo José São Pedro Accioly Filho (born 30 March 1981), known as Accioly, is a Brazilian former footballer who played as a central defender, currently manager of Portuguese club Santa Clara.

He spent the better part of his professional career with Portuguese club Santa Clara, competing mainly in the Segunda Liga (270 matches).

Club career
Born in Salvador, Bahia, Accioly was a youth graduate of hometown side Esporte Clube Bahia. He was promoted to the first team in 1999, and suffered relegation from the Série A in 2003 as dead last. On 13 April 2004, he signed for Série B team Associação Portuguesa de Desportos.

After failing to impress, Accioly subsequently represented ABC Futebol Clube (two stints), Vila Nova Futebol Clube and Associação Atlética Portuguesa before moving abroad in 2006 and joining Portuguese club C.D. Santa Clara. He made his debut in the Segunda Liga on 27 August that year, playing the full 90 minutes in a 1–0 away win against Portimonense S.C. and being booked in the process.

After being a regular starter, Accioly moved to the Azerbaijan Premier League with FC Inter Baku. In July 2009, he appeared in both legs of the UEFA Europa League's first qualifying round against FC Spartak Trnava (5–2 aggregate loss).

Accioly returned to Azores' Santa Clara in the 2012 off-season. He achieved promotion to the Primeira Liga at the end of the 2017–18 campaign, contributing 17 matches to the feat.

On 12 August 2018, aged 37, Accioly made his debut in the Portuguese top division by playing the entire 1–0 away defeat to C.S. Marítimo. He was the oldest player in the league that season, and became the club's assistant manager at its conclusion.

Accioly was named interim manager of Santa Clara when Mário Silva was sacked on 6 January 2023, though Jorge Simão was hired before he could lead them in a match. When the latter was dismissed after no wins and two draws from seven games on 26 February, the Brazilian was put in charge until the end of the campaign. On his debut a week later, the team lost 3–1 at home to Vitória de Guimarães.

Career statistics

Managerial statistics

Honours
ABC
Campeonato Potiguar: 2005
Copa RN: 2005

References

External links

1981 births
Living people
Sportspeople from Salvador, Bahia
Brazilian footballers
Association football defenders
Campeonato Brasileiro Série A players
Campeonato Brasileiro Série B players
Campeonato Brasileiro Série C players
Esporte Clube Bahia players
Associação Portuguesa de Desportos players
ABC Futebol Clube players
Vila Nova Futebol Clube players
Associação Atlética Portuguesa (Santos) players
Primeira Liga players
Liga Portugal 2 players
C.D. Santa Clara players
Azerbaijan Premier League players
Shamakhi FK players
Brazilian expatriate footballers
Expatriate footballers in Portugal
Expatriate footballers in Azerbaijan
Brazilian expatriate sportspeople in Portugal
Brazilian expatriate sportspeople in Azerbaijan
Brazilian football managers
Primeira Liga managers
C.D. Santa Clara managers
Brazilian expatriate football managers
Expatriate football managers in Portugal